This is the discography of Canadian singer-songwriter Paul Anka.

Albums

Studio albums

Compilation albums

Live albums

Singles

See also

 Canadian rock
 Music of Canada

References

Discographies of Canadian artists
Pop music discographies